A hotspot camp is a refugee camp designed as the initial reception point for refugees on the borders of the European Union.

The intention of the hotspots was to coordinate receiving, identifying, and registering refugees on the external borders of the EU.

As of 2018, there were five hotspots in Greece, on islands off the Turkish coast, and five in southern Italy.

Bibliography

 Lauren Martin, Martina Tazziol, eds., "Governing Mobility Through The European Union's 'Hotspot' Centres: A Forum", Society and Space, 2016 
 Alessandra Sciurba, "Categorizing migrants by undermining the right to asylum. The implementation of the 'hotspot approach' in Sicily", Etnografia e ricerca qualitativa 10:1:97-120 (January-April 2017)  full text

Notes

Refugee camps in Europe
European migrant crisis
2010s in Europe